Osokorivka is an inhabited locality in Ukraine and it may refer to:

 Osokorivka, Bobrovytsia Raion, a village in Bobrovytsia Raion, Chernihiv Oblast
 Osokorivka, Synelnykove Raion, a village in Synelnykove Raion, Dnipropetrovsk Oblast
 Osokorivka, Novovorontsovka Raion, a village in Novovorontsovka Raion, Kherson Oblast